Everardo Elizondo Almaguer is a Mexican economist who has worked for private, public, and academic institutions. By senatorial appointment, he served as deputy governor of the Bank of Mexico —the country's central bank— from 1998 to 2008.

Biography

He was born in Linares, Nuevo León. After earning a bachelor's degree with honors in Economics from the Autonomous University of Nuevo Leon (UANL), he graduated with both a master's degree and a Ph.D. in the same discipline at the University of Wisconsin–Madison in the United States. He also completed an International Tax Program diploma from Harvard Law School in 1972.

His professional career started in Monterrey, in the Department of Economic Studies of Compañía General de Acceptaciones, a private financial institution which later became Grupo Financiero Serfin (nowadays Banco Santander). From there he moved to Grupo Alfa, a leader of the Mexican industry in the 1970s, where he served for eight years as director-general for Economic Studies. Afterwards he created and led during nine years a private consultancy: Index, Economía Applicada. He also briefly collaborated as a consultant with the Nuevo León State Government during Sócrates Rizzo's administration. In 1992 he joined Grupo Financiero Bancomer (nowadays BBVA Bancomer) as director of Economic Research.

In 1998 president Ernesto Zedillo invited him to be a member of the Board of Governors of the Bank of Mexico — the central bank— to take the position left by Francisco Gil Díaz as deputy governor. In 2000 the Senate approved his nomination by President Vicente Fox to undertake a full eight-year period, which ended the last day of December 2008.

Elizondo was also a founder and head of the Graduate School of Economics at the Autonomous University of Nuevo Leon, which later became the Postgraduate Studies Division in Economics. He has lectured several courses there and, since 2009, at the Graduate School of Public Administration (EGAP) of the Monterrey Institute of Technology (ITESM). From 1982 to 1983 he visited the Institute for Latin American Studies at the University of Texas at Austin as a research fellow.

He has worked as an economics and finance columnist for more than 35 years, writing a weekly column that is simultaneously published at El Norte and Reforma, and makes eventual contributions to El Economista, academic books and periodicals. He has been a member of the board of directors of several Mexican institutions, such as Universidad Mexicana del Noreste, Grupo Senda, Farmacias Benavides and Grupo Financiero Banorte, where he is an independent advisor since 1 January 2010. He is also a frequent public speaker in Mexico and abroad.

References

1943 births
Living people
Mexican economists
People from Linares, Nuevo León
University of Wisconsin–Madison College of Letters and Science alumni
University of Texas at Austin people
Autonomous University of Nuevo León alumni
Academic staff of the Monterrey Institute of Technology and Higher Education